Eterscél Mór ("the great"), son of Íar mac Dedad, a descendant of Óengus Tuirmech Temrach, of the Érainn of Munster was, according to medieval Irish legend and historical tradition, a High King of Ireland. He succeeded Eochu Airem.

He features in the Middle Irish saga Togail Bruidne Dá Derga (the Destruction of Dá Derga's Hostel). He has no children, and it is prophesied that a woman of unknown race will bear him a son. He finds and forcibly marries the beautiful Mess Búachalla, daughter of Étaín and the former High King Eochu Feidlech (or, in Tochmarc Étaíne, his brother Eochu Airem and his daughter by Étaín), who, because of her incestuous conception, had been exposed but found and brought up by a herdsman and his wife. One night, in Eterscél's house, she is visited by an unknown man who flies in her skylight in the form of a bird, and she has his child, the future High King Conaire Mór, who is brought up as Eterscél's son.

Eterscél ruled for five or six years, at the end of which he was killed by Nuadu Necht in the battle of Aillenn. The Lebor Gabála Érenn synchronises his reign with that of the Roman emperor Augustus (27 BC – AD 14) and the birth of Christ, and makes him contemporary with legendary provincial kings Conchobar mac Nessa, Cairbre Nia Fer, Cú Roí and Ailill mac Máta. The chronology of Geoffrey Keating's Foras Feasa ar Éirinn dates his reign to 70–64 BC, that of the Annals of the Four Masters to 116–111 BC.

References

Further reading

Primary sources
 

Legendary High Kings of Ireland
Cycles of the Kings
1st-century BC legendary rulers
Monarchs killed in action